Billboard Top Rock'n'Roll Hits: 1958 is a compilation album released by Rhino Records in 1988, featuring 10 hit recordings from 1958.

Reception
"All of them are well-known and original recordings, both of which make the collection fairly worthwhile despite its short running time" - Heather Phares for Allmusic.

Track listing
Track information and credits taken from the album's liner notes.

References

1988 compilation albums
Billboard Top Rock'n'Roll Hits albums
Pop rock compilation albums